Bendi may refer to: 
 Translift Bendi Articulated Forklift Trucks
 Bendi languages in the Congo-Nigeria region
 Bendi people of Ituri, in western Africa
 Punti, the Cantonese-speaking populations of Guangdong province in southern China
 Avre Bendi, a Konkani recipe in India
 Bendi-Bus, or Bi-articulated bus in Germany

See also
 Bandy (disambiguation)